Argylia radiata is a species of perennial plant in the family Bignoniaceae. It is found in Brazil, Chile, and Peru.

References

External links

radiata